The Church of the Holy Innocents was an Episcopal church at Willow Avenue and 6th Street in Hoboken, Hudson County, New Jersey, United States. The congregation was founded in 1872. It was built 1885 to the designs of Edward Tuckerman Potter and Henry Vaughan. The choir was added in 1913, the baptistery in 1932. It was added to the National Register of Historic Places in 1977.  It is no longer in use as a church but the building remains.

See also
National Register of Historic Places listings in Hudson County, New Jersey

References

Gothic Revival church buildings in New Jersey
Churches completed in 1872
19th-century Episcopal church buildings
Former churches in New Jersey
Shingle Style church buildings
Churches on the National Register of Historic Places in New Jersey
Churches in Hoboken, New Jersey
Edward Tuckerman Potter church buildings
Churches in Hudson County, New Jersey
National Register of Historic Places in Hudson County, New Jersey
New Jersey Register of Historic Places
Shingle Style architecture in New Jersey